State Route 52 (abbreviated SR 52) is part of Maine's system of state highways, located in the central coast region.

SR 52 forms a complete loop between Camden and Belfast, functioning as an alternate of US 1. US 1 runs along the coastline while SR 52 provides a slightly shorter, inland route between the two communities.

Route description
SR 52 begins in the south in downtown Camden where it meets US 1, a few hundred yards from the southern terminus of SR 105. As it heads northward out of town, it hugs the eastern side of Megunticook Lake (with SR 105 and SR 235 opposite on the west side). SR 52 crosses into Lincolnville where it intersects with SR 173 and overlaps for about a mile. After passing the northern terminus of SR 235, SR 52 splits from SR 173 to the northeast.  SR 52 enters the city of Belfast and reunites with US 1, which runs on a bypass alignment west of downtown. The roadway continues into downtown as unnumbered Lincolnville Avenue.

SR 52 is known as Mountain Street and Turnpike Drive in Camden, Camden Road, Main Street (cosigned with SR 173) and Belfast Road in Lincolnville, and Lincolnville Avenue in Belfast.

History
The entirety of SR 52 was once part of SR 137 in the early 1930s, before the modern US 1 / SR 3 bypass of Belfast was built. In 1960, SR 137 was truncated to its current southern terminus to the north (a terminus it shares with SR 7) and its alignment immediately south of SR 3 was renumbered SR 52. 

When originally designated, SR 52 was defined to run all the way along Lincolnville Avenue to Main Street (which, at the time, carried SR 3 into downtown Belfast where it used to intersect with US 1).  By 1963, US 1 and SR 3 had been moved onto the bypass and SR 52 was cut back to end at the bypass. As a result of the routing changes for the bypass, no numbered routes exist inside of it anymore.

Junction list

References

052
Transportation in Knox County, Maine
Transportation in Waldo County, Maine